Kyle Christopher Hurst (born 20 January 2002) is an English professional footballer who plays as a winger or forward for  club Doncaster Rovers. He began his football career as a youngster with Milton Keynes Dons before joining Birmingham City at 16 and turning professional two years later. He had a loan spell with Southern League club Alvechurch in early 2022, but never played first-team football for Birmingham, and left the club for Doncaster Rovers in July 2022.

Club career

Birmingham City
Hurst was born in Milton Keynes, and was a youth player with Milton Keynes Dons before taking up a two-year scholarship with Birmingham City in July 2018. According to coach Steve Spooner, Hurst is "a wonderful technician. He has great dribbling skills, great receiving skills. Very attack-minded and can deliver good crosses, but he must become more consistent with his end product."

On his first competitive start for Birmingham's development squad team, in September 2018, Hurst scored the second goal of a 4–0 win against Sheffield Wednesday U23. He scored in the semi-final of the 2019 Professional Development League (PDL) play-offs against Ipswich Town, and started in the final, but had been substituted by the time Birmingham lost to Leeds United U23 in a penalty shoot-out. The following season, he scored an 86th-minute winning goal that took Birmingham into the fifth round of the FA Youth Cup despite having had two players sent off; according to the report on the club's website, he "flicked the ball over an opponent, darted on into the area behind the defensive line and cracked a half-volley that went in off the post." Hurst was given a first-team squad number in 2020, but a hamstring issue prevented any involvement with the matchday squad, and he signed his first professional contract, of three years with the option of a fourth, in June 2020. He again helped Birmingham U23 qualify for the PDL play-offs in 2021, and played the whole of the semi-final win away to Bristol City, but was an unused substitute as his side beat Sheffield United to gain promotion to Premier League 2 for 2021–22.

Hurst scored four goals from 17 appearances for Birmingham's U23 team in the 2021–22 Premier League 2 season. He joined Southern League Premier Division Central club Alvechurch in mid-February 2022 on loan until the end of the season. He made his debut in senior football on 12 February, starting in a 1–1 draw away to Tamworth, and made three more appearances before returning to his parent club.

Doncaster Rovers
After a trial in which Hurst played in several pre-season friendlies for Doncaster Rovers, he signed a two-year contract with the League Two club on 22 July 2022. He made his club and Football League debut on the opening day of the 2022–23 season, playing 82 minutes of a goalless draw away to Bradford City before being substituted immediately after receiving a yellow card. Hurst continued in the starting eleven, and scored his first senior goals in his fifth league match, a  chip over the goalkeeper and a powerful shot high to his near post, to complete Doncaster's comeback from 1–0 down against Salford City. On 1 March 2023, by which time he had seven goals from 36 appearances in all competitions, he signed a two-and-a-half-year contract with the club.

Career statistics

References

2002 births
Living people
People from Milton Keynes
Footballers from Buckinghamshire
English footballers
Association football wingers
Association football forwards
Milton Keynes Dons F.C. players
Birmingham City F.C. players
Alvechurch F.C. players
Doncaster Rovers F.C. players
Southern Football League players
English Football League players